Queensbury is a village and a ward of the City of Bradford, West Yorkshire, England.  The ward contains 64 listed buildings that are recorded in the National Heritage List for England.  Of these, one is listed at Grade II*, the middle of the three grades, and the others are at Grade II, the lowest grade.  In addition to the village of Queensbury, the ward contains the areas of Old Dolphin, Clayton Heights, and Catherine Slack and the surrounding countryside.  In the ward are former textile mills, the largest being Black Dyke Mills, and some of the surviving buildings associated with these mills have been listed.  Most of the other listed buildings are houses and cottages and associated structures, farmhouses and farm buildings.  Otherwise, the listed buildings include churches, public houses, a pair of water troughs, milestones, a memorial to Prince Albert, a civic hall, and a war memorial. 


Key

Buildings

References

Citations

Sources

Lists of listed buildings in West Yorkshire